David Mohrig is an American professor of geology and geomorphology whose works have been published in such journals as the Geological Society of America Bulletin, Journal of Hydraulic Engineering and many others. Currently he works at Jackson School of Geosciences of Austin, Texas.

References

External links
David Mohrig

Living people
20th-century births
American geologists
Year of birth missing (living people)